Océane is a French female given name, which means "from the ocean." As of 2006, it was the ninth most popular name for newborn girls in France and Quebec. The name may refer to:

See also
Stade Océane, a football stadium in Le Havre, France
Oceane (opera), 2019 opera by Detlev Glanert
Oceane von Parceval by Theodor Fontane
Océane Aqua-Black, Canadian drag queen

References

Given names
French feminine given names